Koos van der Wildt (23 November 1905 – 25 January 1985) was a Dutch footballer. He played in seven matches for the Netherlands national football team from 1929 to 1930.

References

External links
 

1905 births
1985 deaths
Dutch footballers
Netherlands international footballers
Place of birth missing
Association footballers not categorized by position